The Franklin O-400 (company designation 8AC) was an American air-cooled aircraft engine of the 1940s. The engine was of eight-cylinder, horizontally-opposed layout and displaced .

Variants
8AC-398 at 2,600 rpm.
8ACG-398 at 3,500 rpm. The 8ACG-398 was unusual in using a reduction gearing for take-off and direct drive for cruising.

Specifications (8ACG-398)

See also

References

Notes

Bibliography

 Gunston, Bill. (1986) World Encyclopedia of Aero Engines. Patrick Stephens: Wellingborough. p. 57

Franklin aircraft engines
1940s aircraft piston engines
Boxer engines